Rachel Lyman Field (September 19, 1894 – March 15, 1942) was an American novelist, poet, and children's fiction writer. She is best known for the Newbery Award–winning Hitty, Her First Hundred Years. Field also won a National Book Award, Newbery Honor award and two of her books are on the Lewis Carroll Shelf Award list.

Life
Field was a descendant of David Dudley Field, the early New England clergyman and writer. She grew up in Stockbridge, Massachusetts. Her first published work was an essay entitled "A Winter Walk" printed in St. Nicholas Magazine when she was 16. She was educated at Radcliffe College where she studied writing under George Pierce Baker.

According to Ruth Hill Viguers, Field was "fifteen when she first visited Maine and fell under the spell of its 'island-scattered coast'. Calico Bush [1931] still stands out as a near-perfect re-creation of people and place in a story of courage, understated and beautiful."

Field married Arthur S. Pederson in 1935, with whom she collaborated in 1937 on To See Ourselves. In 1938 one of her plays was adapted for the British film The Londonderry Air. She was also successful as an author of adult fiction, writing the bestsellers Time Out of Mind (1935), All This and Heaven Too (1938), and And Now Tomorrow (1942). They were adapted as films produced under their own titles in 1947, 1940, and 1944, respectively. Field also wrote the English lyrics for the version of Franz Schubert's "Ave Maria" used in the Disney film Fantasia.

She also wrote a story about the nativity of Jesus, "All Through the Night". 

She moved to Hollywood, where she lived with her husband and daughter.

Rachel Field died at the Good Samaritan Hospital on March 15, 1942, of pneumonia following an operation.

Awards

Hitty, Her First Hundred Years received the Newbery Award in 1930, for the year's "most distinguished contribution to American literature for children." As a publicity stunt, Field was informed of her win via radio by a group of librarians and ALA President Milton J. Ferguson who were flying in a second plane as Field flew from New Mexico to Los Angels.

The 1944 (posthumous) Prayer for a Child, with a story by Field and illustrations by Elizabeth Orton Jones, won the Caldecott Medal recognizing the year's "most distinguished picture book for children" published in the U.S.

Hitty and Prayer for a Child were both named to the Lewis Carroll Shelf Award list of books deemed to belong "on the same bookshelf" with Carroll's Alice. Prayer for a Child was one of the seventeen inaugural selections in 1958, which were originally published 1893 to 1957. Hitty was added in 1961.

Time Out of Mind won one of the inaugural National Book Awards as the Most Distinguished Novel of 1935, voted by the American Booksellers Association.

Selected works

 1924, The Pointed People, poetry
 1924, Cinderella Married, A Comedy in One Act, drama
 1924, Six Plays, drama
 1926, Taxis and Toadstools, poetry
 1926, Eliza and the Elves, fiction
 1926, An Alphabet for Boys and Girls, poetry
 1927, The Magic Pawnshop, fiction
 1927, The Cross-Stitch Heart And Other One-Act Plays, drama
 1928, Little Dog Toby, fiction
 1929, Hitty, Her First Hundred Years, fiction—winner of the 1930 Newbery Medal
 1930, A Circus Garland: Poems, poetry
 1931, Calico Bush, fiction
 1931, The Bad Penny: A Drama in One Act, drama
 1932, Hepatica Hawks, fiction (translated into German by Annemarie Böll "Die Tochter des Riesen")
 1933, Just Across The Street, fiction
 1934, Branches Green, poetry (including "Something Told the Wild Geese")
 1934, Susanna B And William C, fiction
 1934, God's Pocket, historical non-fiction
 1935, Time Out Of Mind , fiction
 1936, Fear Is the Thorn, poetry
 1936, First Class Matter: A Comedy in One Act, drama
 1937, To See Ourselves, by Field and her husband Arthur Pederson, fiction
 1938, All This and Heaven Too, based on the true story of Field's great-aunt, Henriette Deluzy-Desportes, and made into a movie, All This, and Heaven Too, in 1940.
 1938(?), The Londonderry Air, drama; produced as a film, The Londonderry Air (1938)
 1940(?), "Ave Maria" lyrics for the film Fantasia (1940)
 1940, All Through the Night, nativity story
 1942, And Now Tomorrow, fiction
 1944, Prayer for a Child, fiction, picture book illustrated by Elizabeth Orton Jones—winner of the 1945 Caldecott Medal

See also

References

External links
 Papers, 1845–1942—finding aid at Radcliffe College Archives, Schlesinger Library, Harvard University (2007)
 Rachel Field collection at the Mortimer Rare Book Collection, Smith College Special Collections
Rachel Field Collection. Yale Collection of American Literature, Beinecke Rare Book and Manuscript Library.

1894 births
1942 deaths
American children's writers
20th-century American novelists
20th-century American poets
Newbery Medal winners
Newbery Honor winners
Radcliffe College alumni
Writers from New York City
National Book Award winners
American women novelists
American women poets
American women children's writers
20th-century American women writers
Novelists from New York (state)